Sari Grönholm (born 4 June 1980) is a Finnish snowboarder. She was born in Uusimaa. She competed at the 2002 Winter Olympics, in women's halfpipe.

References

External links 
 

1980 births
Living people
Sportspeople from Uusimaa
Finnish female snowboarders
Olympic snowboarders of Finland
Snowboarders at the 2002 Winter Olympics